Colubraria nitidula, common name the shiny dwarf triton, is a species of sea snail, a marine gastropod mollusk in the family Colubrariidae.

Description
The length of shell varies between 20 mm and 66 mm.

Distribution
This marine species occurs off Northern Transkei, South Africa; in the Indo-West Pacific (off Mauritius, Aldabra, Mascarene Basin)

References

 Marais J.P. & Kilburn R.N. (2010) Colubrariidae. pp. 54–59, in: Marais A.P. & Seccombe A.D. (eds), Identification guide to the seashells of South Africa. Volume 1. Groenkloof: Centre for Molluscan Studies. 376 pp.

External links
 

Colubrariidae
Gastropods described in 1833